Alessandro Elias Castro Villeda (born February 26, 2000) is a Honduran soccer player who plays as a midfielder for VfR Mannheim in the Verbandsliga Nordbaden in Germany.

Club career
A native of Lilburn, Georgia, Castro joined the Atlanta United academy in 2016, initially as a part of the under-16 team. Notably, he won a U.S. Soccer Development Academy national championship in 2017 as a member of the under-17 side.

He made his professional debut with Atlanta United 2 on May 19, 2018, during a 2–1 defeat to Louisville City.

On July 5, 2018, Castro signed his first professional contract with Atlanta United 2.

International career
He was selected to represent the Honduras U17s at both the 2017 CONCACAF U-17 Championship in April and the 2017 FIFA U-17 World Cup in October.

References

External links
 
 

2000 births
Living people
American people of Honduran descent
People from Lilburn, Georgia
Sportspeople from the Atlanta metropolitan area
Soccer players from Georgia (U.S. state)
Association football midfielders
Honduran footballers
American soccer players
Atlanta United 2 players
USL Championship players
Honduras youth international footballers